Edward Hooson (16 April 1825 – 11 December 1869) was an English chartist, co-operator, and a wire drawer by trade.

Biography 
Hooson was born near Halifax, Yorkshire and had a limited education. He apprenticed as a wire drawer before moving to Manchester where he was active in the chartist movement. He became close friends with the chartist poet Ernest Jones. He was a co-founder of the Union and Emancipation Society based in Manchester, an influential abolitionist campaign in support of the Union in the American Civil War. In the 1860s he was chairman of the Manchester branch of the Reform League.

He was a founding member of the North of England Co-operative Wholesale Society (later the CWS) and served on the committee from 1866 until his death.

Hooson died aged 44 on the 11 December 1869 and was buried in Ardwick cemetery in Manchester.

References 

British cooperative organizers
1825 births
1869 deaths
British abolitionists
Chartists
People from Halifax, West Yorkshire